Kozlovo is a rural locality (a village) in Dvinitskoye Rural Settlement, Sokolsky District, Vologda Oblast, Russia. The population was 10 as of 2002.

Geography 
Kozlovo is located 49 km northeast of Sokol (the district's administrative centre) by road. Vyazovoye is the nearest rural locality.

References 

Rural localities in Sokolsky District, Vologda Oblast